Emanuel Edward Davis (born August 9, 1989) is a former American professional Canadian football defensive back. Davis spent the majority of his CFL career as a member of the Hamilton Tiger-Cats of the Canadian Football League (CFL). He was a member of the Cleveland Browns (NFL), Sacramento Mountain Lions (UFL), and Calgary Stampeders (CFL). Davis played college football at East Carolina.

Professional career 
Davis joined the Hamilton Tiger-Cats in time for the team's 2013 season. In total Davis played in 79 CFL games in his career, contributing with 246 tackles, 14 interceptions, and one quarterback sack. He was named a CFL All-Star in 2015 and CFL East All-Star in 2016. He won the 106th Grey Cup with the Stampeders to conclude his final season of professional football.

References

External links
Hamilton Tiger-Cats bio

1989 births
Living people
African-American players of American football
African-American players of Canadian football
American football defensive backs
Canadian football defensive backs
East Carolina Pirates football players
Hamilton Tiger-Cats players
People from Manteo, North Carolina
Players of American football from North Carolina
Sacramento Mountain Lions players
Calgary Stampeders players
21st-century African-American sportspeople
20th-century African-American people